Pricilla Westlake (born 30 September 1995) is a Canadian international lawn bowler.

She was born in Lae, Papua New Guinea and was selected as part of the Canadian team for the 2018 Commonwealth Games on the Gold Coast in Queensland where she reached the semi finals of the Fours with Joanna Cooper, Leanne Chinery and Jackie Foster.

She won gold medal in the women's singles at the 2017 World Youth Championships.

References

1995 births
Living people
Bowls players at the 2018 Commonwealth Games
Canadian female bowls players
Commonwealth Games competitors for Canada
21st-century Canadian women